The 2019–20 season was Hull City's third consecutive season in the Championship and their 116th year in existence. Along with the Championship, the club competed in the FA Cup and EFL Cup. The season covers the period from 1 July 2019 to 30 June 2020, but also included details from the extended season because of the COVID-19 pandemic. Hull were relegated to League One at the end of the season after finishing in 24th place.

Events
 In February 2019, the new crest to be used from the start of the 2019–20 season was revealed following a supporter-led process of redesigning the club crest. This would be similar to the previous design but with the club name at the top and a different shape.
 On 31 May 2019, the club announced that a Concessionary Ticket Model would be introduced for the 2019–20 season after a vote on ticketing options was made by club members.
 On 8 June 2019, manager Nigel Adkins indicated that he would not take-up the offer of a new contract with the club and left the club before the start of the season. Assistant manager Andy Crosby would also leave the club at the same time.
 On 21 June 2019, Grant McCann was appointed as head coach on a one-year rolling contract, Cliff Byrne would also be joining as his assistant.
 On 25 June 2019, goalkeeper Matt Ingram was signed from Queens Park Rangers on a three-year deal for an undisclosed fee.
 On 5 July 2019, Charlie Andrew went on loan to Bradford (Park Avenue) until January 2020. Though on 20 September 2019, he moved on a month-long loan spell to Alfreton Town. This was later extend for the remainder of the season. But on 31 January 2020, he was allowed to go on a free transfer to Lincoln City.
 On 8 July 2019, David Marshall signed for Wigan Athletic after his contract ran out at Hull.
 On 10 July 2019, Tom Eaves  joined the club on a three-year deal after turning down a contract extension with Gillingham.
 On 15 July 2019, Danny Lupano was signed from Birmingham City for an undisclosed fee.
 On 18 July 2019, Ryan Tafazolli signed a two-year deal with the club, after being released by Peterborough United.
 On 18 July 2019, Josh Bowler joined on a season-long loan from Everton, which was confirmed on 1 June 2020 as the end of the 2019–20 season.
 On 24 July 2019, Harvey Cartwright moved on a season-long loan to Barton Town.
 On 25 July 2019, Eric Lichaj was named as captain with Jackson Irvine as vice-captain.
 On 26 July 2019, Sean McLoughlin of Cork City completed a three-year deal with the club for an undisclosed fee. Though he was loaned out for six months on 31 July  2019 to St Mirren.
 On 29 July 2019, Max Sheaf joined Cheltenham Town on loan until January 2020, which was later extended to the end of the season.
 On 2 August 2019, George Honeyman, of Sunderland, signed a three-year deal with the club for an undisclosed fee.
 On 8 August 2019, goalkeeper Harrison Foulkes rejoined Pickering Town on loan until January 2020.
 On 8 August 2019, mid-fielder Leonardo Lopes of Wigan Athletic signed a three-year deal with the club for an undisclosed fee.
 On 8 August 2019, Jacob Greaves signed a three-year contract extension with the club and then moved on loan to Cheltenham Town until January 2020, which was later extended to the end of the season.
 On 8 August 2019, Matthew Pennington of Everton signed a season-long loan deal with the club, which was confirmed on 5 June 2020 as the end of the 2019–20 season.
 On 8 August 2019, Josh Magennis of Bolton Wanderers signed a two-year deal with the club for a nominal fee.
 On 8 August 2019, Callum Elder of Leicester City signed a three-year deal with the club for an undisclosed fee.
 On 16 August 2019, Callum Jones signed a one-year deal from Bury for an undisclosed fee.
 On 20 August 2019, Elliot Bonds signed from Dagenham & Redbridge, until the end if the 2019–20 season, on a free transfer.
 On 21 August 2019, Lewis Ritson moved on loan to Blyth Spartans until January 2020.
 On 2 September 2019, Nouha Dicko joined Vitesse Arnhem on loan for the remainder of the season.
 On 14 September 2019, signed Norbert Balogh from Palermo on a free transfer on a one-year contract, but on 29 May 2020 he left the club by mutual consent.
 On 23 September 2019, Andy Dawson returned to the club as part of the Academy Coaching Staff.
 On 18 October 2019, goalkeeper David Robson moved to Gainsborough Trinity to gain some work experience.
 On 30 October 2019, Billy Chadwick and David Robson joined Gainsborough Trinity on loan until December 2019.
 On 11 November 2019, Will Taylor moved to Pickering Town on a free transfer.
 On 29 November 2019, Will Mannion moved on loan to Kidderminster Harriers until  January 2020, but this was later extended for the remainder of the season.
 On 6 December 2019, Tyler Hamilton moved to Hartlepool United on loan until 4 January 2020, this was later extended for a month. On 31 January 2020, Hamilton's contract was terminated by mutual consent.
 On 3 January 2020, Herbie Kane, of Liverpool, signed a loan-deal with the club for the remainder of the 2019–20 season, which was confirmed on 8 June 2020 as the end of the 2019–20 season.
 On 16 January 2020, Martin Samuelsen, of West Ham United, signed a two-and-a-half-year contract with the club for an undisclosed fee.
 On 17 January 2020, Brandon Fleming moved on loan to Bolton Wanderers for the remainder of the season.
 On 17 January 2020, Mallik Wilks joined on-loan from Barnsley for the remainder of the season, with an option for the deal to become permanent, but Barnsley refused to allow him to extend his contract to the end of the 2019–20 season.
 On 27 January 2020, David Milinković moved on loan to Vancouver Whitecaps until 31 December 2020.
 On 31 January 2020, Kamil Grosicki signed an 18-month contract with West Bromwich Albion for an undisclosed fee.
 On 31 January 2020, Marcus Maddison joined on loan from Peterborough United for the remainder of the season.
 On 31 January 2020, Alex John joined on loan from Yeovil Town until the end of the season, with an option to make the move permanent.
 On 31 January 2020, Danny Lupano joined Derry City on loan until the end of the season.
 On 31 January 2020, Markus Henriksen moved on loan to Bristol City for the remainer of the season, but was allowed to leave on 21 June 2020 to pursue "other options".
 On 31 January 2020, James Scott, of Motherwell, signed a three-and-a-half-year deal for £1.5 million. The club holding an option for a year extension.
 On 31 January 2020, Jarrod Bowen five-and-a-half-year contract with West Ham United for £22 million.
 On 5 February 2020, the club announced the death of Kris Blakeston one of the Academy coaches, the match against Swansea City on 14 February 2020 was dedicated to his memory.
 On 10 June 2020, Jon Toral, Kevin Stewart and Angus MacDonald agreed short-term contract extensions to cover the extended season.
 On 11 June 2020, Daniel Batty agreed a short-term contract extension to cover the extended season.
 On 15 June 2020, Robbie McKenzie agreed a short-term contract extension to cover the extended season.
 On 16 June 2020, following Kidderminster Harriers season termination on 22 April 2020 after a vote of clubs in the league, Will Mannion returned to the club and agreed a short-term contract extension to cover the extended season.
 On 16 June 2020, the club indicated they had failed to agree short-term contract extensions with Eric Lichaj, Jackson Irvine, Stephen Kingsley and loanee Marcus Maddison. The four player will leave the club at the end of June 2020 and not take part in the remaining matches once the season resumes.
 On 17 June 2020, Jordy de Wijs was named as captain for rest of the restarted season.
 On 26 June 2020, the club took up an option for a year extension to Daniel Batty's contract.
 On 30 June 2020, the club announced that Nouha Dicko and Markus Henriksen would leave after the expiry of their contracts.
 On 2 July 2020, Mallik Wilks joined Hull on a two-year permanent deal.
 On 2 July 2020, Festus Arthur of Stockport County signed a three-year deal for an undisclosed fee.

Effects of the COVID-19 pandemic

On 13 March 2020, the season was suspended due to COVID-19 pandemic, initially until 3 April but later extended to mid-May.

On 13 May, following an EFL meeting, the clubs decided to continue with the season with plans for players to return to training on 25 May.

In May, 1,014 tests were carried out across all of the English Football League and funded by the clubs. Two people from Hull City returned positive results.

On 31 May, the EFL stated plans to restart the league on 20 June, with the play-off final being scheduled for around 30 July, subject to safety requirement and government approval being met.

On 8 June, the first round of fixtures was released. The first set of fixtures following the restart was scheduled for 20 June with Hull's first fixture being the postponed home game against Charlton Athletic with a 3:00 pm kick-off. All the remaining fixtures would be played behind closed doors.

Squad

Out on loan

Transfers

Transfers in

Loans in

Transfers out

Loans out

Pre-season

On 4 June 2019, the club announced 3 pre-season friendly matches, Leyton Orient on 9 July 2019, Mansfield Town on 20 July 2019 and Doncaster Rovers on 27 July 2019. On 18 June 2019, a home match against French side Amiens SC was announced for 24 July 2019. The newly appointed head coach, Grant McCann, would take charge of the team as they return to pre-season training on 24 June 2019. A further pre-season friendly match was announced on 2 July 2019 against Lincoln Red Imps to take place on 12 July 2019 in Marbella, Spain.

A week-long pre-season training camp in Marbella took place from 7 July 2019, with the first 2 friendly games taking place at the Marbella Football Center.

Mid-season

Competitions

Overall

Championship

League table

Results by matchday

Result summary

Matches
On Thursday, 20 June 2019, the EFL Championship fixtures were revealed, and Hull started the campaign away to Swansea City on 3 August 2019. The season should have concluded on 2 May 2020 with another away trip, this time to Cardiff City, but because of the COVID-19 pandemic this did not take place until 22 July 2020.

FA Cup

Hull City enter the competition at the third round stage, the draw for which took place on 2 December 2019. Hull were drawn away to either Solihull Moors or Rotherham United with the match to be played the first weekend in January 2020. The second round replay between Solihull Moors and Rotherham United took place later the same day as the third round draw and Rotherham United fought back to beat Solihull Moors 4–3 to progress to play Hull.

The third-round match took place on 4 January 2020, and Tom Eaves gave Hull the lead after 16 minutes but Michael Smith struck back 4 minutes later. After 24 minutes Rotherham defender Adam Thompson brought down Keane Lewis-Potter and was sent off. Just before half-time Kyle Vassell scored to give Rotherham the lead. Eaves headed in his second of the match after 66 minutes and scored his hat-trick in added time to put Hull through to the fourth-round. The draw for the fourth-round took place on 6 January 2020 and Hull were drawn at home to Chelsea. The match being selected for live coverage by BT Sport was played at 5:30 p.m. on 25 January 2020. The match was a sell-out with the match seeing the biggest cup crowd at the KCOM Stadium and the largest since January 1973 against West Ham United at Boothferry Park.

Hull city started the match brightly but Chelsea scored an early goal when a shot from Michy Batshuayi was deflected in by Ryan Tafazolli. In the second half Fikayo Tomori knocked in a free-kick by Ross Barkley to double the visitors tally. Hull replied through substitute Kamil Grosicki's free-kick that was deflected into the goal off the wall. Hull pressed but could not convert any further chances they had so Chelsea progressed to the Fifth round.

EFL Cup

The first round draw was made on 20 June 2019. Hull were in the Northern Section of the draw and were drawn away to Tranmere Rovers, the match to take place on 13 August 2019 at Prenton Park. The match started with Jon Toral heading a goal for Hull after just 19 seconds, with David Milinković knocking in a rebound five-minutes later. Hull made it 0–3 just before half-time when Ryan Tafazolli headed home a cross from Milinković. The nearest Tranmere got was in the second-half when Morgan Ferrier hit the crossbar.
The draw took place on 13 August 2019 for the Second round and Hull were drawn away to Preston North End, the match to take place on 27 August 2019. Preston opened the scoring after 20-minutes through Paul Huntington and doubled their advantage 6-minues later through Josh Harrop. Hull cut the lead when Josh Magennis scored a penalty after 34-minutes, a last minute Jarrod Bowen equaliser sent the game to penalties. Preston scored 5 of their spot kicks but Hull only managed 4 with Tom Eaves failing to score. Preston progressed to the next round.

Statistics

Appearances

|-
|colspan="12"|Players who played for Hull City but subsequently left the club:

Note: Appearances shown after a "+" indicate player came on during course of match.

Top goalscorers

Disciplinary record

Kits
The home kit for the 2019–20 season was unveiled on 14 June 2019, manufactured by Umbro, the shirt is amber with a tiger pattern on the upper front, together with the new crest. This will be complemented by black with amber trim shorts and amber socks with black "Tigers" lettering. The away kit was revealed on 9 July 2019 as a white shirt with black trim to the collar and black and amber trim to the sleeves. The shorts are white with amber trim. The socks are white with black top and amber detail. The third kit was revealed on 13 August 2019 as a deep lagoon colour with amber trim. The shorts are in medieval blue with amber contrast side panels, with deep lagoon socks with navy turnover and amber Tigers lettering.
On 11 September 2019, the club announced a new back-of-shirt sponsor, On Line Group, who have agreed a 3-year sponsorship deal.

Notes

References

2019-20
Hull City
2010s in Kingston upon Hull